Islamic International Medical College (abbreviated as IIMC), established in 1996, is a medical school affiliated with Riphah International University and located in Rawalpindi, Punjab, Pakistan. It is registered with PMDC and ECFMG, listed in the World Directory of Medical Schools, and approved by the Ministry of Health.

Campus
The campus is situated in the premises of the old Pakistan Supreme Court building in Rawalpindi.

Attached hospitals
Pakistan Railways General Hospital
Islamic International Medical Complex
Heart International Hospital

Degrees awarded
Bachelor of Medicine, Bachelor of Surgery (MBBS) - 5 years

External links
 

Medical colleges in Punjab, Pakistan